Fairview is a rural community in the Timaru District, New Zealand. It is located southwest of Timaru.

Demographics

Fairview had a population of 1,641 at the 2018 New Zealand census, an increase of 60 people (3.8%) since the 2013 census, and an increase of 54 people (3.4%) since the 2006 census. There were 633 households. There were 846 males and 798 females, giving a sex ratio of 1.06 males per female. The median age was 45.8 years (compared with 37.4 years nationally), with 285 people (17.4%) aged under 15 years, 267 (16.3%) aged 15 to 29, 807 (49.2%) aged 30 to 64, and 282 (17.2%) aged 65 or older.

Ethnicities were 92.9% European/Pākehā, 9.9% Māori, 2.0% Pacific peoples, 2.2% Asian, and 1.6% other ethnicities (totals add to more than 100% since people could identify with multiple ethnicities).

The proportion of people born overseas was 11.5%, compared with 27.1% nationally.

Although some people objected to giving their religion, 51.7% had no religion, 37.1% were Christian, 0.4% were Buddhist and 2.0% had other religions.

Of those at least 15 years old, 150 (11.1%) people had a bachelor or higher degree, and 336 (24.8%) people had no formal qualifications. The median income was $32,800, compared with $31,800 nationally. The employment status of those at least 15 was that 723 (53.3%) people were employed full-time, 234 (17.3%) were part-time, and 27 (2.0%) were unemployed.

Education
Barton Rural School is a full primary catering for years 1 to 8. It has a roll of  students. The school was created by the 2005 amalgamation of Fairview (established 1882) and Claremont (1878) schools.

Beaconsfield School is a full primary catering for years 1 to 8. It has a roll of  students. It was created by the 1997 amalgamation of Southburn (established 1892) and Pareora West (1874 - and also once called Beaconsfield School) schools, and Salisbury School (1899) was merged with it in 2005.

Both schools are coeducational. Rolls are as of

References

Timaru District
Populated places in Canterbury, New Zealand